Pakistan competed at the 2016 Summer Olympics in Rio de Janeiro, Brazil, from 5 to 21 August 2016. This was the nation's seventeenth appearance at the Summer Olympics. Pakistan has not won any medal since 1992 Summer Olympics.

National Olympic Committee of Pakistan sent the nation's smallest ever delegation to the Games, as the men's field hockey failed to qualify for the first time in a non-boycott Olympic edition. A total of seven athletes, four men and three women, were selected to the Pakistani team across four different sports. All of them had gained their Olympic entries, either through Tripartite Commission invitations or quota spots, with swimmers Lianna Swan and Haris Bandey, as well as judoka Shah Hussain Shah, being based abroad. Meanwhile, rapid fire pistol shooter Ghulam Mustafa Bashir was nominated by the Pakistan Sports Board (PSB) to bear the nation's flag in the opening ceremony.

Pakistan's Olympic campaign ended on August 15, a week before the close of the Olympics, after Najma Parveen failed to pass the preliminary heats in the women's 200 metres, making it Pakistan's worst ever performance at the Olympics.

Athletics

Pakistan has received universality slots from IAAF to send two athletes (one male and one female) to the Olympics.

Judo

Pakistan has qualified one judoka for the men's half-heavyweight category (100 kg) at the Games, signifying the nation's Olympic debut in judo. Hussain Shah earned a continental quota spot from the Asian region, as Pakistan's top-ranked judoka outside of direct qualifying position in the IJF World Ranking List of May 30, 2016.

Shooting
 
Pakistan has received two invitations from the Tripartite Commission to send shooters competing in the men's 25 m rapid fire pistol and women's 10 m air rifle, respectively, to the Olympics.

Qualification Legend: Q = Qualify for the next round; q = Qualify for the bronze medal (shotgun)

Swimming

Pakistan has received a Universality invitation from FINA to send two swimmers (one male and one female) to the Olympics.

References

External links 
 

Olympics
Nations at the 2016 Summer Olympics
2016